Glendale Municipal Airport  is a city-owned, public-use airport located  west of the central business district of Glendale, a city in Maricopa County, Arizona, United States. It is included in the National Plan of Integrated Airport Systems for 2011–2015, which categorized it as a general aviation reliever airport.

Although most U.S. airports use the same three-letter location identifier for the FAA and IATA, this airport is assigned GEU by the FAA but has no designation from the IATA The airport's ICAO identifier is KGEU.

Facilities and aircraft 
It has one runway: 
 1/19 measuring  asphalt

For the 12-month period ending December 31, 2008, the airport had 136,289 aircraft operations, an average of 373 per day: 98% general aviation, 1.% air taxi, and 1% military. At that time there were 220 aircraft based at this airport: 78% single-engine, 11% ultralight, 8% multi-engine, 2% jet, and 1% helicopter.

References

External links 
 City of Glendale - Airport
 Glendale Municipal Airport (GEU) at Arizona DOT airport directory
 
 

Airports in Maricopa County, Arizona
Transportation in Glendale, Arizona
Buildings and structures in Glendale, Arizona